A vane display is a type of 7-segment display. Unlike LED and VFD segmented displays, vane displays are composed of seven physical surfaces (vanes), typically painted white, but occasionally other colors, such as yellow or fluorescent green. If a segment is to be displayed as "off", it will be rotated so that its edge faces forward, with the painted surface pointing away and not visible. A segment that is to be displayed as "on" will be rotated so that the painted surface is shown.

Vane displays operate in a similar manner to flip-disc displays, in that the segments are quickly moved using electromagnets. Some variants used where the display need not necessarily be changed quickly use electric motors to rotate the displays in and out of place.

Vane displays have been used in game shows and on scoreboards in sports arenas and stadiums. Like eggcrate displays, they are not washed out by bright lights such as those found in a television studio. Another benefit of the vane display is that if the power supply is lost, the display will continue to show whatever the last value was before power was cut. However, like flip-disc displays, if many elements must be changed at the same time, the flipping displays may present a significant amount of noise.

Examples 
American and Canadian game shows have used vane displays to display contestants' scores or for countdown clocks. Prior to this, the slide display was more common.
The Oklahoma Turnpike Authority has used vane displays on several of their automatic toll collection baskets to display the toll due.
The New Jersey Turnpike previously used vane displays for all roadway speed limit signs; it was not uncommon to see them blank; VMS sign replacements now use a new electronic speed limit sign. Various other locations with variable speed limits also employ either this or eggcrate, flip-disc, or LED displays to display the current speed limit for the area.

Display technology